Phước Điền Temple (also known as Chùa Hang or Hang Pagoda) is a temple in Châu Đốc, An Giang Province, southwestern Vietnam. It is an official historic monument, proclaimed on July 10, 1980, by the Ministry of Culture and Information of Vietnam.

Gallery

Buddhist temples in An Giang Province